The Cockade of Spain is a national symbol that arose after the French revolution, by pleating a golden pin over the former red ribbon, colors of the ancient Royal Bend of Castile. The resulting insignia is a circle that symbolizes the colors of the Spanish flag: Red and Yellow, being carried as individual representation in case of distinctions or prizes or by other types of events. At the moment it is not used in Spain, except as a roundel for the identification of Spanish Armed Forces aircraft.

Gallery

See also 
 Roundel of the Spanish Republican Air Force

References

Antonio Cánovas del Castillo, De la escarapela roja y las banderas y divisas utilizadas en España

National symbols of Spain
Cockades